The following is a list of cities in Ukraine that underwent a name change since 1 January 1986, based on the database of the Verkhovna Rada.

Chernihiv Oblast
 Snovsk → Shchors (1935) → Snovsk (2016)

Crimea
 Aluston → Lusta → Aluşta → Alushta (1784)
 Ermeni Bazar → Armianskyi Bazar (1736) → Armiansk (1921)
 Karasubazar → Bilohirsk (1944)
 Aqmeçit → Chornomorske (1944)
 Canköy → Dzhankoi (1784)
 Kerkinitis → Kezlev (7th century) → Gözleve → Yevpatoria (1784)
 Theodosia → Ardabda → Kafas → Caffa → Kefe (1475) → Feodosia (1784)
 Sarabuz → Hvardiiske (1944)
 Inkerman → Belokamensk (1976) → Inkerman (1991)
 Panticapaeum → Bosporus → Korchev → Vosporo/Cerchio → Kerch
 İslâm Terek → Kirovske (1944)
 Kurman-Kumelĉi → Krasnohvardiyske (1944)
 Qızıltaş → Krasnokamianka (1945)
 Aşağı Otuz → Prymorie (1945) → Kurortne (1978)
 Albat → Kuibysheve (1945)
 Yedi Quyu → Sem Kolodezey (1784) → Lenine (1957)
 Seyitler → Nyzhniohirsk (1944)
 Büyük Onlar → Oktiabrske (1945)
 Kaygador → Provalnoe → Dvoiakornoie → Bubnovka → Ordjonikidze (1937)
 Yañı Küçükköy → Parkove
 Or Qapı → Perekop (1736)
 Curçı → Pervomaiske (1944)
 Aşağı Kikineiz → Ponyzivka
 Bazarçıq → Poshtove (1945)
 Hafuz → Yuzhnaia Tochka (1938) → Prymosrkyi (1952)
 Aqşeyh → Rozdolne (1944)
 Saq → Saky (1784)
 Aqyar → Sevastopol (1826; also: Sebastopol)
 Otuz → Shchebetovka (1944)
 Aqmescit → Simferopol (1784)
 Dolossı → Sovietske
 İçki → Sovietskyi (1944)
 Eski Qırım → Staryi Krym (1783)
 Sudaq → Sudak (1784)

Dnipropetrovsk Oblast
 Yekaterinoslav → Novorossiysk (1797) → Yekaterinoslav (1802) → Dnipropetrovsk (Dnepropetrovsk) (1926) → Dnipro (2016)
 Kamianske → Dniprodzerzhynsk (1936) → Kamianske (2016)
 Mykytyne → Slovyanske (1775) → Nikopol (1781)
 Samara → Novomoskovsk (1782)
 Shakhtarske → Pershotravensk (1960)
 Ordzhonikidze → Pokrov (2016)

Donetsk Oblast
 Donetsko-Amvrosiyevka → Amvrosiivka (1938)
 Nelepovsky → Artyoma (1921) → Artemove (1938) → Zalizne (2016)
 Avdeyevka I & Avdeyevka II → Avdiivka (1956)
 Bakhmut → Artemivsk (1924) → Bakhmut (2016)
 Belozyorka → Bilozerske (1966)
 Paraskoviivka & Erastovsky rudnik & Svyatogorovsky (Krasnoarmeysky, 1920) rudnik → Dobropillia (1935)
 Yelenovskiye Karyery → Dokuchaievsk (1954)
 Yuzovka → Stalino (1924) → Donetsk (1961)
 Grodovsky rudnik → Novy Donbass (1934) → Novoekonomichne (1957) → Dymytrov (1965) → Myrnohrad (2016)
 Sotsgorodok → Hirnyk (1958)
 Nova Khrestovka → Kirovske (1958)
 Karakybbud → Komsomolske (1949)
 Kramatorskaya → Kramatorsk (1932)
 Grishyno → Postysheve (1934) → Krasnoarmiiske (1938) → Krasnoarmiisk (1938) → Pokrovsk (2016) 
 Kurakhovgresstroy → Kurakhovgres (1943) → Kurakhove (1956)
 Lyman → Krasnyi Lyman (1938) → Lyman (2016)
 Dmitriyevskoye → Dmitriyevsk (1925) → Makiivka (1931)
 Manhush → Pershotravneve (1946) → Manhush (1995)
 Pavlovsk → Mariupol (1779) → Zhdanov (1948) → Mariupol (1989)
 Gladky → Staronikolskoye (1855) → Nikolske → Volodarske (1924) → Nikolske (2016)
 Novonikolayevskaya → Budyonnovskaya (1923) → Budyonivsky (1938) → Novoazovsky (1959) → Novoazovsk (1966)
 Grodovka → Novohrodivka (1958)
 Selidovka → Selydove (1956)
 Alekseyevo-Orlovka & Olkhovchik → Katyk → Shakhtarsk (1953)
 Yama → Siversk (1973)
 Tor → Sloviansk (1784)
 Vasilyevka → Snezhnaya (1864) → Snizhne (1920)
 Bryantsevsky → Bryantsevka (1924) → Karla Libknekhta (1926) → Karlo-Libknekhtove (1965) & Bilokamyanske → Karlo-Libknekhtovsk (1965) → Soledar (1991)
 Bannoe → Banne (1929) → Bannovske (1938) → Slovianohirsk (1964) → Sviatohirsk (2003)
 Uglegorskoy TES → Svitlodarske (1969) → Svitlodarsk (1992)
 Shcherbinovka → Shcherbinovsky → Dzerzhynsk (1938) → Toretsk (2016)
 Alekseyevka → Alekseyevo-Leonovo (1857) → Chystyakove (1932) → Torez (1964)
 Lesovka → Ukrainsk (1963)
 Bolshoy Yanisol → Velyka Novosilka (1946)
 Khatsapetovka → Vuhlehirsk (1958)
 Yenakiyevo → Rykovo (1928) → Ordzhonikidze (1937) → Yenakiieve (1943)
 Bunge → Yunikh Komunarov (1924) → Yunokomunarovskoye (1965) → Yunokomunarivsk (1965)
 Novo-Zhdanovka → Zhdanov rudnik (1966) → Zhdanivka (1966)

Ivano-Frankivsk Oblast
 Stanisławów (founded) → Stanislaviv (1939) → Ivano-Frankivsk (1962)
 Yaremcha → Yaremche (2006)

Kharkiv Oblast
 Konstantingrad → Krasnohrad (1922)
 Lykhachove → Pervomaiskyi (1952)
 Zmiiv → Zmeyev (1656) → Hotvald (1976) → Zmiiv (1990)

Kherson Oblast
 Chapli → Askania (1828) → Askania Nova (1835)
 Holy → Golaya Pristan (1786) → Hola Prystan (1923)
 Geniczi → Genichesk (1784) → Henichesk (1923)
 Oleshky → Alioshki (1802) → Tsiurupynsk (1928) → Oleshky (2016)
 Ali-Agok → Skadovskoye (1894) → Skadovsk (1933)

Khmelnytsky Oblast
 Liakhivtsi → Bilohiria (1949)
 Proskuriv → Khmelnytskyi (1954)

Kirovohrad Oblast
 Yelizavetgrad (1784) → Zinovyevsk (1924) → Kirovo (1934) → Kirovohrad (1939) → Kropyvnytskyi (2016)
 Hrushkivskyi Vysilok → Blahovishchenske (1921) → Ulianovka (1924) → Blahovishchenske (2016)

Kyiv Oblast
Chernobyl –> Chornobyl'
 Pereiaslav → Pereiaslav-Khmelnytskyi (1943) → Pereiaslav (2019)

Luhansk Oblast
 Yuryevka → Alchevsk (1903) → Voroshylovsk (1931) → Voroshylovsk/Alchevsk (1957) → Komunarsk (1961) → Alchevsk (1991)
 Izium → Almaznaya (1878) → Almazna (1977)
 Bokovo-Antratsyt → Antratsyt (1962)
 Yekaterinovka → Artem (1923) → Artemivsk (1938)
 Gorskoye → Hirske (1938)
 Golubyevskiy Rudnik → Kirovsk (1962)
 Sorokino → Krasnodon (1938) → Sorokyne (2016)
 Kryndachiovka → Krasnyi Luch (1920)
 Lugansk → Voroshylovhrad (1935) → Luhansk (1958) → Voroshylovhrad (1970) → Luhansk (1990)
 Aleksandrovka → Petro-Maryevka (1865) → Pervomaisk (1920)
 Kadiyevka → Sergo (1937) → Kadiivka (1940) → Stakhanov (1978) → Kadiivka (2016)

Lviv Oblast
 Krystynopol (founded) → Chervonograd/Chervonohrad (1951) → Chervonohrad (1991)
 Dymoszyn (first mentioned) → Kamionka Strumiłowa (15th century) → Kamenka-Bugskaya/Kamianka-Buzka (1944) → Kamianka-Buzka (1991)
 Komarno → Komarne → Komarno (1992)
 Lviv → Lwów (1356) → (Lemberg) (1772) → Lvov/Lviv (1939) → Lemberg (1941) → Lvov/Lviv (1944) → Lviv (1991)
 Yantarne → Novoiarovivske (1969) → Novoiavorivsk (2008)
 Novyi Rozdol → Novyi Rozdil (1992)
 Żółkiew (founded) → Zhovkva (1939) → Nesterov (1951) → Zhovkva (1992)

Mykolaiv Oblast
 Fedorivka → Fiodorovka (1776) → Novaya Odessa (1832) → Nova Odesa (1989)
 Kara Kerman → Özi → Ochakov (1792) → Ochakiv (1989)
 Orlyk → Orlovsky sconce (1743) → Yekaterinsky sconce (1770) → Olviopol (1781) → Pervomaisk (1919)
 Konstantinovka-2 (founded) → Yuzhnoukrainsk (1987)

Odesa Oblast
 Ophiusa → Asperon → Moncastro → Cetatea Albă (1391) → Akkerman (1503) → Cetatea Albă (1918) → Bilhorod-Dnistrovskyi (1944)
 Buh Khutirs → Illichivsk (1952) → Chornomorsk (2016)
 Birzula → Kotovsk (1935) → Podilsk (2016)
 Hacibey → Odesa (rebuilt 1794)

Poltava Oblast
 Komsomolsk-na-Dnipri (or simply Komsomolsk) → Horishni Plavni (2016)
 Stalinka → Chervonozavodske (1961) → Zavodkse (2016)

Rivne Oblast
 Radzylivy → Chervonoarmiysk (1939/40) → Radyvyliv (1992)
 Równo → Rovno → Rivne (1991)
 Hvarash → Varazh (or Varash, Variazh, Hvariazh) → Kuznetsovsk (1977) → Varash (2016)

Ternopil Oblast
 Tarnopol (founded) → Ternopil (1939)

Volyn Oblast
 Lutsk → Luchesk (1427) → Łuck (1569) → Lutsk (1795) → Mikhailogorod (1850) → Luck (1915) → Łuck (1919) → Lutsk (1939)
 Volodymer (founded) → Vladimir-Volynskiy (1795) → Volodymyr-Volynskyi (1991) → Volodymyr (2021)

Zakarpattia Oblast
Beregszasz → Beregovo → Berehove
 Munkács → Mukačevo (1919) → Munkács (1938) → Mukacheve (1945) → Mukachevo (2017)
 Ungvár (1248) → Užhorod (1919) → Ungvár (1938) → Uzhhorod (1944)

Zaporizhzhia Oblast
 Alexandrovsk → Zaporizhzhia (1921)

Zhytomyr Oblast
 Zwiahel → Novohrad-Volynskyi (1795) → Zviahel (2022)

See also 
 List of Ukrainian toponyms that were changed as part of decommunization in 2016
 List of renamed cities in Belarus
 List of renamed cities in Moldova
 List of renamed cities and towns in Russia

References

Source 
 

 
Renamed, Ukraine
+
Ukraine